Alas are an operatic progressive metal band from Tampa, Florida, U.S.

History
Alas was formed and led by Death metal pioneer Morbid Angel ex-guitarist Erik Rutan. They also featured well known Cannibal Corpse bassist Alex Webster. They released an album called Absolute Purity in 2001.

Band members

Current members 
 Martina Astner - vocals
 Howard Davis - drums, percussion
 Scot Hornick - bass guitar
 Erik Rutan - guitars

Past members 
 Tracey Beant - vocals
 Clayton Gore - drums, percussion
 Jason Morgan - guitars
 Alex Webster - bass guitar

Discography

Demos
 Engulfed in Grief (1996)
 Engulfed in Grief / Promo '97 (1997)

Albums
 Absolute Purity (2001)

Notes

External links
 Official MySpace

American symphonic metal musical groups
Musical groups from Tampa, Florida
Musical groups established in 1996
1996 establishments in Florida